Bloom*Iz (stylized in all caps and pronounced "bloom eyes") is the first and only Korean-language studio album by South Korean–Japanese girl group Iz*One, a project group formed through the 2018 Mnet reality competition show Produce 48. The album was released on February 17, 2020 by Off the Record Entertainment and distributed by Stone Music Entertainment and Genie Music. It features 12 tracks, including the lead single "Fiesta".

The album was originally scheduled for release on November 11, 2019, but it was postponed following the Mnet vote manipulation investigation, it was the group's first full-length album since their debut in October 2018, and their first Korean release since Heart*Iz the previous year.

The album is available in three different versions: "I Was", "I Am", and "I Will".

Release
On October 29, 2019, a concept trailer titled "When Iz Your Blooming Moment?" was uploaded on the group's YouTube channel. Its concept, featuring flowers in full bloom and the members in various states of waking, was called "colorful and sensual". The group's official website was also re-branded. The track listing was revealed through the group's social media on November 3. However, following the Mnet vote manipulation investigation, where the Produce 48 producer Ahn Joon-young admitted he had manipulated the rankings for Produce 48 during his November 5 arrest, Off the Record announced that the album's release had been postponed.

On January 23, 2020, an official statement from Mnet was released, stating that promotions for Iz*One, including the release of Bloom*Iz, would resume in mid-February. On February 2, Iz*One's official Twitter account announced the release of Bloom*Iz for February 17, 2020. Three days later, Mnet M2MPD's Twitter account revealed that the group's comeback showcase will be aired simultaneously on Mnet, M2, and Stone Music's YouTube and Facebook. Over February 6–7, unreleased photos of the members were revealed as part of their early promotions for the upcoming comeback.

Promotion
Iz*One promoted the single "Fiesta" on the music shows M Countdown, Music Bank, Music Core, Inkigayo, The Show, and Show Champion which started on February 17.

Critical reception
Billboard described the title track "Fiesta" as a "festive synth pop song which takes its name to heart with the sliding, synth pop throbber of a track that explodes into a brass led dance breakdown" and reported that the mixed emotions portrayed in the other tracks of the album show power in the group coming together in moments of collective delicate vulnerability.

Kat Moon of Time named the album as one of the best K-pop releases of 2020 noticing how fierce and bold girl crush image has become increasingly popular in K-pop but Iz*One's image has stayed unapologetically sweet and cute. She called the album a welcome addition to the group's "kaleidoscopic" discography describing how the album showcases the group at its best, serving up a sonic palette of colors that demonstrates the varied hues and tints in bubblegum pop.

Commercial performance
The album topped in its first week of pre-order availability across various Korean and Japanese websites, including Aladin, Yes24, and Tower Records. In addition, the album had the highest number of pre-orders in 2019 with 150,000 sales just six days before its release. However, the release was postponed following the Mnet vote manipulation investigation, and orders were cancelled and refunded.

On February 17, on their first day of sales, Iz*One took the record for the most albums sold on the first day for a girl group, with about 184,000 copies sold. The album also broke the record of girl group's first week sales on Hanteo, with 356,313 copies sold on its first 7 days, until it was broken by their next album four months later.

Track listing

Charts

Certifications and sales

See also
List of 2020 albums

References

2020 albums
Iz*One albums
Korean-language albums
Genie Music albums
Stone Music Entertainment albums